[La] Serenissima ([The] Most Serene) may refer to:

Certain countries
 , a name for the Republic of Venice
 , the official Latin name of the Polish–Lithuanian Commonwealth

Art, entertainment, and media
 La Serenissima (musical ensemble), a British early music/period instrument ensemble
 La Serenissima (album), a 1981 album by Rondò Veneziano, also released as Venice in Peril
 "La Serenissima", a single by Rondò Veneziano, later covered by DNA and by Mike Candys
 "La Serenissima", an instrumental track from Loreena McKennitt's release, The Book of Secrets (1997)

Sport
Scuderia Serenissima, an auto racing team
Serenissima, a nickname for the San Marino national football team

Other uses
 La Serenísima, an Argentine dairy products maker

 Autostrada A4 (Italy), nicknamed Serenissima after its destination, Venice

See also
 Most Serene Republic